Vitaly Zakharov (born 18 December 1967) is a Belarusian épée fencer. He competed at the 1996 and 2000 Summer Olympics.

References

1967 births
Living people
Belarusian male épée fencers
Olympic fencers of Belarus
Fencers at the 1996 Summer Olympics
Fencers at the 2000 Summer Olympics
People from Fergana
21st-century Belarusian people